Paul McKenzie may refer to:

Paul McKenzie (rugby union) (born 1984), Irish rugby union player (Exeter Chiefs, Ireland 'A')
Paul McKenzie (footballer, born 1964), Scottish football player (Partick Thistle, Falkirk FC, Hamilton Academical)
Paul McKenzie (footballer, born 1969), Scottish football player (Burnley FC)
Paul McKenzie (sailor), Australian Olympic sailor
Paul McKenzie, member of The Real McKenzies